Lise Maree Mackie is an Australian former freestyle swimmer of the 1990s, who won a bronze medal in the 4×200-metre freestyle relay at the 1996 Summer Olympics competing for Australia. She also competed in the 1992 Summer Olympics in Barcelona, Spain.  She attended college at the University of Nevada, Reno in the United States.  She holds several school records for swimming and was inducted into the university's athletic hall of fame in 2009. She was an Australian Institute of Sport scholarship holder.

Mackie had an unsuccessful debut in 1992 at the Barcelona games, where the team finished ninth in the 4×100-metre freestyle relay, missing the final.  At the 1996 Summer Olympics in Atlanta, Mackie swam in the heats of the 4×200-metre freestyle relay, before being replaced in the finals as Susie O'Neill, Nicole Stevenson, Emma Johnson and Julia Greville trailed the United States and Germany, to claim bronze.  Mackie was also a member of the 4×100-metre freestyle relay team which finished 6th.

See also
 List of Olympic medalists in swimming (women)

References

External links 
 Australian Olympic Committee profile
 University of Nevada, Reno profile

1975 births
Australian female freestyle swimmers
Living people
Olympic swimmers of Australia
Swimmers at the 1992 Summer Olympics
Swimmers at the 1996 Summer Olympics
Olympic bronze medalists for Australia
Olympic bronze medalists in swimming
Nevada Wolf Pack women's swimmers
Australian Institute of Sport swimmers
Medalists at the FINA World Swimming Championships (25 m)
People educated at Brisbane State High School
Sportspeople from Te Kūiti
Medalists at the 1996 Summer Olympics
20th-century Australian women